The 1996–97 Slovenian Second League season started on 17 August 1996 and ended on 1 June 1997. Each team played a total of 29 matches. NK Naklo merged with Triglav Kranj during the season.

League standing

See also
1996–97 Slovenian PrvaLiga
1996–97 Slovenian Third League

References

External links
Football Association of Slovenia 

Slovenian Second League seasons
2
Slovenia